WebstaurantStore is an online restaurant supply company based in Lititz, Pennsylvania. The company offers commercial-grade equipment to the foodservice industry through online ordering and commercial shipping, and carries over 342,000 products. Like sister brand The Restaurant Store, WebstaurantStore is a division of Clark Associates, Inc., which was named Central Pennsylvania's fastest growing company in 2013 and 2018 by the Central Penn Business Journal, making the list of the region's fastest-growing companies nine years in a row. In 2021, Clark Associates, Inc. was also rated as the largest distributor of restaurant supplies by Foodservice Equipment & Supplies Magazine (FE&S), and was awarded FE&S' Dealer of the Year Award in 2015. In 2017, the company received a Management Excellence award from Foodservice Equipment Reports Magazine. WebstaurantStore was chosen as the featured e-commerce business for Pennsylvania in Google's Economic Impact Report for 2013.

History
WebstaurantStore was formed in Lancaster, Pennsylvania as a business-to-business (B2B) sales company. The company is currently led by President Dave Groff (brother of actor Jonathan Groff) who helped establish the business in 2004. In 2012, WebstaurantStore expanded to Madisonville, Kentucky followed by other expansions to Dayton, Nevada in 2013 and Cumberland, Maryland in 2014. To date, WebstaurantStore also operates warehouses in Pennsylvania; Durant, Oklahoma; and Albany, Georgia. In 2013, the company moved headquarters from Smoketown to Lititz. Office locations have since expanded from Pennsylvania into Albany, Georgia; Madisonville, Kentucky; and Tampa Bay, Florida.

According to their website, WebstaurantStore ships to 96 percent of the United States within two days. In 2018, WebstaurantStore launched its WebstaurantPlus program, which offers free ground shipping and priority order processing to subscribers for a $99 monthly fee. The service is available to customers within the 48 contiguous United States. In 2021, WebstaurantStore partnered with First Bankcard to offer users a Webstaurant Rewards Visa Card and a Webstaurant Rewards Visa Business Card that each unlock rewards and special offers for cardholders.

Charitable initiatives
As a subsidiary of Clark Associates, Inc., WebstaurantStore is a contributing member of the Clark Associates Charitable Foundation. The foundation raises money through donations to give back to the local community in a number of ways, including academic scholarships. In 2021, a trio of nature preserves were combined in Lancaster County and named the Clark Nature Preserve after the foundation gifted a donation to the Lancaster Conservancy.

Since 2016 WebstaurantStore has independently offered a scholarship for culinary arts and hospitality management students. The company organizes "Volunteer Days" on a monthly basis to aid local organizations, with previous collaborators including Water Street Ministries, the Sierra Club, and Relay for Life. WebstaurantStore has also opened its doors to host local professional organizations such as Lancaster Young Professionals. In 2018, WebstaurantStore sponsored Tampa Community Connect in support of the Tampa area developer community.

References

Catering and food service companies of the United States
Companies based in Lancaster County, Pennsylvania
Online companies of the United States
Online food retailers of the United States
Online food ordering